Yewa South, (formerly Egbado South), is a Local Government Area in the west of Ogun State, Nigeria bordering the Republic of Benin. Its headquarters are in the town of Ilaro at in the north of the Area.

It has an area of 629 km and a population of 168,850 at the 2006 census.

The postal code of the area is 111.

The area has 10 wards, Ilaro I, Ilaro II, Ilaro III, Iwoye, Idogo, Owode I, Owode II, Ilobi/Erinja, Oke-Odan and Ajilete.

The people speak the Yewa dialects of the Yoruba language as well as Ogu language of gbè language family, called “Ègùn” by the Yorùbá language speakers.
There are seven areas or villages headed by Obas or Royal Fathers:  Ilaro, Idogo, Iwoye, Oke-Odan, Ijanna, Itoro, Owode, Erinja, Ajilete and Ilobi.

References

Local Government Areas in Ogun State
Local Government Areas in Yorubaland